Ary-Mas is a forest in Russia, Krasnoyarsk Krai, southern part of Taymyr Peninsula, southern bank of Novaya River. Ary-Mas comes from the Dolgan language and means "forest island".

Considered to be the northernmost forest of the world although Lukunsky grove to the east from it extends 6 kilometres further north. Though, while Lukunsky grove is northernmost rim of larger forest massif, Ary-Mas is a forest island separated from the nearest forest by approximately 200 kilometres wide zone of tundra.

Climate
Vegetation period is approximately 100 days long. Winter here lasts from late September - early October to June; minimum temperatures often fall below -35 – -45 °C, and wind speed in winter often exceeds 50 m/s.

Polar day lasts from the early May to early August, median temperature in July is 12 °C, often up to 30 °C.

Permafrost in summer thaws 0.3 – 2 metres deep. Thickness of permafrost here is approximately 200 metres.

Biodiversity
The only tree-form species of Ary-Mas is Dahurian larch (Larix gmelinii (Rupr.) Rupr.)), but in total in Ary-Mas there have been found 306 species of plants, 90 species of birds, 20 species of mammals.

Dahurian larch grows sparsely, separate trees grow up to 5 – 7 metres tall.

Conservation and scientific investigations
Ary-Mas is a protected territory with area 156,11 km2. It forms a part of Taymyr State Nature Biosphere Reserve and is protected since 1979.

Constant investigations of Dahurian larch started in 1969 and have continued since then. Current scientific studies are led by the Taymyr State Nature Biosphere Reserve and major part of results are compiled in yearly nature reports.

References

External links
 Wondermondo, Ary-Mas - the northern forest
 State Nature Biosphere Reserve "Taymyrsky"

Forests of Russia
Extreme points of Earth